Henry William Inwood (22 May, 1794 – 20 March, 1843) was an English architect, archaeologist, classical scholar and writer. He was the joint architect, with his father William Inwood of  St Pancras New Church.

Biography

He was the son of the architect  William Inwood,  with whom he collaborated on a  number of  churches, including  St Pancras New Church (1819–22), the commission for which was won in an open competition.  John Summerson believed that he was the main designer of St Pancras – which he describes as a "skilful and mature work" – his father not having previously designed any architecturally ambitious buildings. The design drew closely on Ancient Greek models, imitating elements from the Erechtheum and the Tower of the Winds in Athens. Inwood had not been  to Greece at the time the initial design was submitted in May 1818, but travelled there soon afterward, making careful observations of the buildings on which St Pancras was based. He later published the results of his studies as  The Erechtheion at Athens: Fragments of Athenian Architecture and a few remains in Attica, Megara, and Epirus (1827).

The Inwoods  collaborated on two other Greek Revival churches in the parish of St Pancras:  All Saints, Camden Town (1822–4), and St Peter's, Regent Square (1822–5, now demolished). They were also joint architects of St Mary's Chapel, Somers Town  in the same parish, built in 1824–7 in a naive "Carpenter's Gothic" style. Inwood collaborated with E.N. Clifton on two churches: the Gothic St. Stephen, Canonbury (1837-9),  and the Neoclassical St James Islington (1837-8)

In 1834 he published a pamphlet entitled Of the Resources of Design in the Architecture of Greece, Egypt, and other Countries, obtained by the Studies of the Architects of those Countries from Nature, which suggested that the flutings of Doric columns were taken from reeds, mineral formations or seashells; that Egyptian mummies  were wrapped in imitation of the cocoons of moths, and that the image of the sphinx was inspired by a butterfly chrysalis.

Inwood died in a shipwreck on a journey to Spain when the ship he was in sank with no survivors.

Gallery of architectural work

References

Further reading
 Oxford Dictionary of National Biography (2004)

1794 births
1843 deaths
English ecclesiastical architects
English classical scholars
English male writers